Mbuguni is an administrative ward in the Meru District of the Arusha Region of Tanzania. The road that goes to Mererani, Manyara Region actually passes through Mbuguni ward. Making Mbuguni a trade route for the Tanzanite gemston. According to the 2002 census, the ward had a total population of 14,880.

References

Wards of Meru District
Wards of Arusha Region